Abu Mu'az al-Jeddawi, a Saudi who reportedly lived in Yemen, is believed to have been rendered by the CIA to Jordan in early 2002.  His real name is believed to be Ahmad Ibrahim Abu al-Hasana.

Al-Jeddawi was listed by the FBI as a wanted terrorism suspect in February 2002. He was identified as a known associate of a Yemeni Al Qaeda leader named Fawaz Yahya al-Rabeei.

February 12, 2002 terror alert
In early 2002, according to an FBI report, as a result of US military operations in Afghanistan and of on-going interviews of detainees in Guantanamo Bay, Cuba, information became available on February 11, 2002 regarding threats to US interests which indicated that a planned attack may have been about to occur in the United States or against US interests in the country of Yemen on or around the next day, February 12, 2002.

In response, on February 11, 2002, the FBI listed Abu Mu'az al-Jeddawi and 16 other suspected terrorists to the FBI Seeking Information - War on Terrorism list. The early version of that list was then known as the "Most Wanted Terrorists Seeking Information" list. Years later, the FBI removed his profile from the main page of that list.

On February 14, 2002, several days after the FBI alert, six of the names were removed from the list, and the FBI re-published the list with only eleven names and photos. Six of the suspects who had been named were already in custody.

The six names identified in the Yemen plot on February 11, 2002, but who were removed from the list on February 14, 2002, are: Issam Ahmad Dibwan al-Makhlafi, Ahmad al-Akhader Nasser Albidani, Bashir Ali Nasser al-Sharari, Abdulaziz Muhammad Saleh bin Otash, Shuhour Abdullah Mukbil al-Sabri and Riyadh Shikawi.

Abu Mu'az al-Jeddawi remained listed among the eleven names still being sought on February 14, 2002.  The others who also remained were: Fawaz Yahya al-Rabeei, Omar Ahmad Omar al-Hubishi, Ammar Abadah Nasser al-Wa'eli, Alyan Muhammad Ali al-Wa'eli, Bassam Abdullah bin Bushar al-Nahdi, Mustafa Abdulkader Aabed al-Ansari, Samir Abduh Sa'id al-Maktawi, Abdulrab Muhammad Muhammad Ali al-Sayfi, Abu Nasr al-Tunisi and Amin Saad Muhammad al-Zumari.

Whether foiled, aborted, or merely incorrect specific intelligence, the February 12, 2002 attack never occurred.

CIA Rendition to Jordan

Human Rights Watch has reported that al-Jeddawi was rendered by the CIA to Amman, Jordan, in early 2002, where he was held in the custody of the Jordan's General Intelligence Department (GID).  Human Rights Watch researchers spoke to two former detainees held by the GID who said that they communicated with al-Jeddawi while he was detained at the GID detention facility in late 2002; a third former detainee wrote that he saw al-Jeddawi there, too.

Human Rights Watch's sources differ regarding where al-Jeddawi was arrested.  Both al-Tabuki and another person claim that al-Jeddawi was arrested in Yemen.  Al-Tabuki said that he was arrested less than a month after his wedding.  A third source, however, who was also held in GID custody with al-Jeddawi, believes that al-Jeddawi was arrested in Kuwait, although he was not certain about this point.  All of them agree, at any rate, that al-Jeddawi was in US custody prior to being handed over to Jordan.  And according to one source, a US agent "hit him in the head."

One person, who told Human Rights Watch that al-Jeddawi was "famous in Afghanistan," said:

He was a really rich guy, and he lived in Yemen; he was married to a Yemeni woman.  The Yemenis arrested him and handed him over to the US.  I actually saw him in GID: we met in the bathroom thanks to the help of a nice soldier.

This same informant not only saw al-Jeddawi in custody in late 2002 but also communicated with al-Jeddawi's family later. He said that the family told him that al-Jeddawi was held at the GID facility for more than a year, during which time he was kept hidden from the ICRC.  Al-Jeddawi is believed to be currently incarcerated in Saudi Arabia.

See also
Extraordinary rendition

References

External links
Human Rights Watch, Double Jeopardy: CIA Rendition to Jordan (2008)

Saudi Arabian expatriates in Yemen
Al-Jeddawi, Abu Mu'az
Living people
Year of birth missing (living people)